Pitai Airport  is an airstrip in the sparsely populated Bolivian pampa of the Beni Department of Bolivia.

See also

Transport in Bolivia
List of airports in Bolivia

References

External links 
OpenStreetMap - Pitai
OurAirports - Pitai
FallingRain - Pitai Airport

Airports in Beni Department